Events from the year 1655 in Denmark.

Incumbents 
 Monarch – Frederick III
 Steward of the Realm – Joachim Gersdorff

Events

Undated 
 Paul Kurtz comes to Denmark from Germany where he later becomes Goldsmith to the Danish Court

Culture

Art
 Abel Schrøder completes an elaboratelyu carved Cartilage Baroque-style altarpiece for Vester Egesborg Church in Næstved.

Births 
 6 March – Frederik Krag, civil servant (died 1728)
 10 September – Caspar Bartholin the Younger, anatomist (died 1738)
 1 December – Bendix Grodtschilling the Younger, painter (died 1707)

Deaths 
 31 August - Ole Worm, physician and antiquary (born 1588)

References 

 
Denmark
Years of the 17th century in Denmark